Aphanius vladykovi (Zagros pupfish) is a species of old world pupfish endemic to a restricted area of the central Zagros Mountains of Iran. It can also be found in the aquarium trade. Its specific name honours the zoologist  Vadim D. Vladykov (1898-1986) who studied the fishes of the Caspian basin and wo accepted the species author, Brian W. Coad, as a graduate student.

Little information on this species beyond the original description and some brief biological observations is available.

The main habitats of the fish are Choghakhor Lagoon, Gandoman Lagoon, Salm Lake, Shalamzar Lake and Beheshtabad River all in Chaharmahal va Bakhtiari Province, Iran. The native fish population is threatened by different factors including environmental pollution as well as biological threats such as parasites. The fish has been infected with a migratory parasite larva to the extent of 100 and 68 percent, respectively in 2011 and 2018.

This species is a close relative of Aphanius sophiae, but characterised by a higher lateral line scale counts and by its color pattern: males have darker coloration on the dorsal fin and a lighter one on the anal fin. Females lack the typical, large, lozenge-shaped spot at the base of the caudal fin seen in A. sophiae.

The stomach content of this fish consists mostly of freshwater crustaceans and the relative length of the gut  suggests a carnivorous habit. The eggs have an average diameter of 1 mm and the average absolute and relative fecundity is 415 and 110, respectively. The gonadosomatic ratio and ovary condition suggests that the reproductive season of the species is between late March and June with a peak in early April. The species is euryhaline and eurythermal and prefers neutral to basic waters. It is usually found in well-oxygenated waters, but is tolerant to hypoxia, as well.

References

vladykovi
Fauna of Iran
Fish described in 1988
Endemic fauna of Iran